Fox 23 may refer to one of five television stations in the United States affiliated with the Fox television network:

WXXA-TV, licensed to Albany, New York
KOKI-TV, licensed to Tulsa, Oklahoma
KBSI, licensed to Cape Girardeau, Missouri
WPFO, licensed to Waterville, Maine
WHPM-LD, licensed to Hattiesburg, Mississippi